The 2013 Campeonato Alagoano de Futebol was the 83rd season of Alagoas's top professional football league. The competition began on January 12 and ended on May 19. CRB were the champions for the 27th time. Sport Atalaia and União were relegated.

Format
In the first stage consists of a double round-robin format. The four teams who place the highest will qualify for the "Hexagonal". CRB and ASA are directly qualified for the "Hexagonal" as Copa do Nordeste participants.
The best four teams of the "Hexagonal" advance to the playoffs.  The worst four teams from the first stage will play in the Torneio da Morte, a relegation round where the two worst teams in this round will be relegated.

If CRB or ASA finished 6th they will play an extra relegation playoff will be held.

The best team which is not in Campeonato Brasileiro Série A, Série B or Série C will qualify to the 2013 Campeonato Brasileiro Série D. The three best teams qualifies to the 2014 Copa do Brasil.

Participating teams

First round (first stage)

Results

Second round ("Hexagonal")

Results

Playoffs

Semifinals

First leg

Second leg

Finals

Relegation round (Torneio da Morte)

Results

Attendance

References

External links
 Official site

Alagoano
Campeonato Alagoano